Art School Confidential is a 2006 American comedy-drama film directed by Terry Zwigoff and starring Max Minghella, Sophia Myles, John Malkovich, Jim Broadbent, Matt Keeslar, Ethan Suplee, Joel Moore, Nick Swardson, Adam Scott, and Anjelica Huston. It is loosely based on the comic of the same name by Daniel Clowes. The film is Zwigoff's second collaboration with Clowes, the first being 2001's Ghost World (which was also released by United Artists).

Plot
Inspired by his longtime love of drawing, and hoping to meet girls, Jerome enrolls at the Strathmore School of Art. His roommates are aspiring filmmaker Vince and closeted-gay fashion major Matthew. Jerome looks for love amongst the female students, but is unsuccessful until he falls for art model Audrey, the daughter of a famous pop artist.

Jerome forms a friendship with classmate and perennial loser, Bardo, a four-time dropout, who guides him through the college scene and introduces him to Jimmy, a Strathmore graduate who is now a failed artist and belligerent drunk.

As Jerome learns how the art world really works, he finds that he must adapt his vision to reality. Jerome slowly loses his idealism at art school and finds himself in competition with a mysterious student named Jonah for both Audrey's affection and artistic recognition. At the same time, a serial killer known as the Strathmore Strangler is on the loose near the campus, confounding the police and inspiring Vince to create a documentary about the murders.

In a wild attempt to win a prestigious art competition, Jerome asks for, and gets, Jimmy's paintings, unbeknownst to him are the Strangler's victims. Accidentally dropping a lit cigarette in Jimmy's apartment, he causes a fire that destroys the building, leaving Jimmy and all the other residents dead. The police arrest Jerome as the Strangler (who in fact was Jimmy).

Audrey realizes Jerome is her true love and that she was stupid to be interested in Jonah, who turns out to be an undercover police officer with a wife and baby at home. Jerome is sent to prison, but his paintings, particularly one of Audrey, become prized by collectors.

Vince scores a huge hit with his documentary about the Strangler called My Roommate: The Murderer. In prison, Jerome continues to paint and sells his works at high prices, not caring that people think he is the killer as it has brought him financial success and recognition. Audrey comes to visit him in prison, and they share a kiss through the protective glass.

Cast
 Max Minghella as Jerome
 Sophia Myles as Audrey
 John Malkovich as Professor Sandiford
 Anjelica Huston as Art History Teacher
 Jim Broadbent as Jimmy
 Matt Keeslar as Jonah
 Ethan Suplee as Vince
 Joel Moore as Bardo
 Nick Swardson as Matthew
 Adam Scott as Marvin Bushmiller
 Ezra Buzzington as Leslie
 Katherine Moennig as Candace
 Bob Golub as Hector
 Scoot McNairy as Army-Jacket
 Steve Buscemi (uncredited) as Broadway Bob D'Annunzio
 Ozman Sirgood as Dad Platz
 Charlie Talbert as Vince's Editor
 Brian Geraghty as Stoob
 Michael Shamus Wiles as Donald Baumgarten
 Shelly Cole as Filthy-Haired Girl

Production
Sophia Myles was terrified about her nude scene (the first in her career) but finally she did it. "If there is going to be nudity in a film, I would rather do it myself than use my body double. If they use one, they can go and do a day's shooting, you don't know what they're doing and people still think it's you," she said.

Reception

Art School Confidential received mixed feedback from critics. Review aggregator Rotten Tomatoes reports that 35% of 136 film critics have given the film a positive review, with a rating average of 5.40/10. The site's critics consensus reads: "Art School [Confidential]s misanthropy is too sour, its targets too flat and clichéd, and Clowes and Zwigoff stumble when trying to build a story around the premise." Metacritic, which assigns a weighted average score out of 100 to reviews from mainstream critics, gives the film a score of 54 based on 42 reviews.

Artwork in the film 
Much of the artwork featured in the film was produced by practicing visual artists with art careers independent of the film. The figurative drawings and paintings made by the main character Jerome were created by Caitlin Mitchell-Dayton, an Oakland, California painter and long-time professor at the San Francisco Art Institute. The Marvin Bushmiller character's work was created by musician and Devo member Mark Mothersbaugh, who is also a painter with a long exhibition record independent of his involvement with the film. The paintings made by the character Jonah were produced by Oakland, California artist and graphic novelist Daniel Clowes, creator of the short comic on which the film was based as well as the author of its screenplay and co-producer.

References

External links
 
 
 
 
 
 

2006 comedy-drama films
2006 films
American comedy-drama films
American LGBT-related films
Films based on American comics
Films directed by Terry Zwigoff
Films scored by David Kitay
Films set in New York City
Films set in universities and colleges
Films shot in Los Angeles
Films shot in New York City
HIV/AIDS in American films
Live-action films based on comics
American independent films
Sony Pictures Classics films
United Artists films
Mr. Mudd films
Gay-related films
2006 LGBT-related films
2006 independent films
LGBT-related comedy-drama films
2000s English-language films
2000s American films